The Prestige is a former greyhound racing competition that was held annually at Hall Green Stadium in Birmingham, England, from 2003-2017. The event discontinued following the closure of Hall Green Stadium in July 2017.

Past winners

Venues and distances 
2003-2017 (Hall Green 645m)

Sponsors
2003-2006 William Hill
2007-2008 Betdirect
2009-2009 William Hill
2010-2011 Betfair
2012-2013 Local Parking Security Ltd
2014-2015 Partex Marking Systems
2017-2017 Greyhound Media Group

References

External links
British Greyhound Racing Board

Greyhound racing competitions in the United Kingdom
Recurring sporting events established in 2003
Sports competitions in Birmingham, West Midlands